is a Japanese tarento and a former member of the Japanese idol girl group SKE48 represented by Twin Planet. She was a member of SKE48's Team E.

Career 
Suda passed SKE48's 3rd generation auditions on 11 November 2009, and debuted on 8 December 2009 at SKE48's Team S stage performance. On 27 February 2010, she was promoted to Team S. Her first SKE48 Senbatsu was for the single "1! 2! 3! 4! Yoroshiku!". 

In the 2011 general elections, Suda placed 36th and entered Undergirls. In April 2013, she was transferred to Team KII. She started activities as a Team KII member in July 2013.

In the 2013 general elections, Suda entered senbatsu at 16th place. In February 2014, during the AKB48 Group Shuffle, it was announced Suda would be transferred to Team E. She climbed up the ranks to 10th place at the 2014 general elections.

Discography

SKE48 singles

AKB48 singles

Appearances

Stage units
SKE48 Kenkyuusei Stage 
 
 
SKE48 Team S 3rd Stage 
 
 
SKE48 Team KII 4th Stage 
 
SKE48 Team E 4th Stage

TV variety
  (2010-2012)
 AKBingo! (2010– )
  (2010)
  (2011-2012)
  (2011)
  (2012)
  (2012)
  (2013)
  (2014– )
  (2014)
  (2014)
  (2014-2015)

TV dramas
  (2011)
  (2015), Tsurishi
  (2015), Tsurishi
  Ep.2 - Soup (2015), Miki

Film
 Utahime Obaka Miiko (2020), Miiko Okaba

Anime
  (2015), 32GB Ko

Musicals
 Musical AKB49 -Renai Kinshi Jourei- - Okabe Ai (2014), Urayama Minoru/Urakawa Minori (2016)

References

External links
 SKE48 Official Profile 
 Official Blog 
 Akari Suda on Google+

1991 births
Living people
Japanese idols
Japanese women pop singers
Musicians from Aichi Prefecture
SKE48 members
Ironman Heavymetalweight Champions